Dichomeris hexasticta is a moth in the family Gelechiidae. It was described by Walsingham in 1911. It is found in Mexico (Guerrero).

The forewings are pale straw-ochreous, with a black spot at the extreme base which is produced outward in a thin line along the costa, nearly to the middle, and is narrowly margined beneath with whitish ochreous. Before the middle of the wing is a group of four conspicuous black spots, three on the cell arranged as an equilateral triangle with the apex outward, the fourth on the fold below and a little beyond the lower of the three. Beyond these at the end of the cell are two similar spots, the upper a little beyond the lower and there is a series of six to eight much smaller black spots along the termen and around the apex. The hindwings are greyish cinereous.

References

Moths described in 1911
hexasticta